A total solar eclipse occurred on September 23, 1699. A solar eclipse occurs when the Moon passes between Earth and the Sun, thereby totally or partly obscuring the image of the Sun for a viewer on Earth. A total solar eclipse occurs when the Moon's apparent diameter is larger than the Sun's, blocking all direct sunlight, turning day into darkness. Totality occurs in a narrow path across Earth's surface, with the partial solar eclipse visible over a surrounding region thousands of kilometres wide.
A narrow path of totality just clipped the north-east corner of Scotland, including Wick.

Related eclipses 
It is a part of Solar Saros 139.

See also 
 List of solar eclipses visible from the United Kingdom

References

 NASA chart graphics
 Googlemap
 NASA Besselian elements

1699 09 23
1699 in science
1699 09 23